AMD K8L, although not an official code name, has been suggested to refer to one of the following:
AMD Turion 64, AMD's mobile-optimized Athlon 64 version.
AMD K10, AMD's next generation processor core.